The 1966 Sugar Bowl was the 32nd edition of the college football bowl game, played at Tulane Stadium in New Orleans, Louisiana, on Saturday, January 1 . Part of the 1965–66 bowl game season, it matched the undefeated and sixth-ranked Missouri Tigers of the Big Eight Conference and the unranked Florida Gators of the Southeastern Conference (SEC). Missouri was slightly favored, and won 20–18.

Teams

Missouri

The Tigers entered the game with a 7–2–1 record; they lost by two points to undefeated #5 Nebraska in the Big Eight.

Florida

The Gators had three losses during the regular season.

Game summary
The Sugar Bowl was the first game of a major bowl tripleheader (Rose, Orange) on NBC, and kicked off at 1 pm CST.

After a scoreless first quarter, Missouri went on a tear in the second quarter. Charlie Brown scored on a 16-yard touchdown run giving the Tigers a 7–0 lead. Defensive back Johnny Roland came in on offense and threw an 11-yard touchdown pass to Earl Denny as the Tigers extended their lead to 14–0. Bill Bates kicked a 27-yard field goal and Missouri led 17–0 at halftime.

In the third quarter, Bates kicked a 34-yard field goal as Missouri led 20–0 at the end of three. Florida attempted to make a furious comeback in the fourth quarter; quarterback Steve Spurrier threw a 22-yard touchdown pass to halfback Jack Harper as Florida got within 20–6. Spurrier threw another 21-yard touchdown pass to end Charles Casey as Florida got within 20–12. Spurrier scored himself from two yards out, as the score became 20–18. Florida failed on three consecutive two-point conversion attempts, and had they just kicked the extra points, they may have ended with a win.

Despite playing on the losing team, Spurrier was named the Most Valuable Player for the game.

Scoring
First quarter
No scoring
Second quarter
Missouri – Charlie Brown 10-yard run (Bill Bates kick)
Missouri – Earl Denny 11-yard pass from Johnny Roland (Bates kick)
Missouri – Bates 37-yard field goal
Third quarter
Missouri – Bates 34-yard field goal
Fourth quarter
Florida – Jack Harper 22-yard pass from Steve Spurrier (pass failed)
Florida – Spurrier 2-yard run (pass failed)
Florida – Charles Casey 21-yard pass from Spurrier (pass failed)

Statistics
{| class=wikitable style="text-align:center"
! Statistics !! Missouri !! Florida
|-
|First downs||18||18
|-
|Rushing||62–257||16–(-2)
|-
|Passing||5–14–1||27–46–1
|-
|Passing yards||50||352
|-
|Total offense||76–307||62–350
|-
|Punts–avg.||5–44.0||6–32.5
|-
|Fumbles–lost||2–2||1–1
|-
|Turnovers||3||2
|-
|Penalties–yards||2–30||3–25
|}

Aftermath
This was the sixth major bowl appearance for Missouri, and their second Sugar Bowl (1942). Their only major bowl since was four years later in the Orange Bowl. Missouri honored the 1965 Tigers in the 2015 season, bringing the team to midfield at halftime of their 24–10 win over South Carolina, then coached by Spurrier.

This was Florida's first appearance in a major bowl; their first victory came  the following year in the Orange Bowl. The Gators' next Sugar Bowl was in December 1974 and their first win came in January 1994.

References

Sugar Bowl
Sugar Bowl
Florida Gators football bowl games
Missouri Tigers football bowl games
Sugar Bowl
Sugar Bowl